List of mountains of British Columbia is a list of mountains in the Canadian province of British Columbia.

List of Mountains

See also
Geography of British Columbia
List of mountains of Canada
Mountain peaks of Canada
List of mountain peaks of North America
List of mountain peaks of the Rocky Mountains

Notes

 
British Columbia
Mountains